A pressure ridge is a topographic ridge produced by compression.

Depending on the affected material, "pressure ridge" may refer to:
 Pressure ridge (ice), between ice floes
 Pressure ridge (lava), in a lava flow
 Pressure ridge (seismic), in a fault zone

In a seismic context, a pressure ridge can range in size from a few-metres-long mound, to a kilometres-long lateral ridge. It is the result of one or several earthquakes occurring on certain types of fault geometries, such as compressional bends or stepovers along strike-slip faults. A pressure ridge can for instance be the result of a deep-set obstruction on the fault plane, which leads to material being pushed up during earthquakes.

See also

 Ridge (meteorology), an elongated area of relatively high atmospheric pressure

References

Structural geology
Stratigraphy
Faults (geology)
Tectonic landforms
Earth's crust